Deborah Ann Googe (born 24 October 1962) is an English musician, best known as bassist for the band My Bloody Valentine. She has also worked with Snowpony, Primal Scream and Thurston Moore.

My Bloody Valentine
Googe was born in Yeovil, Somerset, England. Prior to joining My Bloody Valentine, she played for a band called Bikini Mutants in her hometown of Yeovil, who gigged with The Mob. Googe had moved from Yeovil to London, and in early 1985, an ex-girlfriend of hers recommended her as a bass player to Kevin Shields and Colm Ó Cíosóig of My Bloody Valentine. She joined the band after an audition in April 1985. She left the group in 1996, noting she "hadn't been happy for a long time".

Googe is known for her raucous style of bass playing in MBV's live performances.

Googe joined My Bloody Valentine's 2007 reunion, and their subsequent tours.

Work outside My Bloody Valentine
After leaving MBV in 1995, Googe briefly became a taxi driver. She formed Snowpony in 1996 with her then-girlfriend, Katharine Gifford, formerly of Stereolab. They released three albums and four EPs between 1997 and 2003.

She occasionally plays keyboards with the massed fuzz organ experimentalists band Pimmel and also plays drums and sings backing vocals for Rockhard.

In 2012 it was announced that Googe would be the new bassist for Primal Scream, replacing Mani after his departure to rejoin The Stone Roses. She was subsequently succeeded by Simone Butler.

On 4 August 2014, Googe joined Thurston Moore for his solo project The Best Day, and continued this collaboration with his subsequent albums Rock n Roll Consciousness in 2017 and By The Fire 2020, alongside Steve Shelley, and the UK musicians James Sedwards. and Jem Doulton.

She also contributed bass for two tracks on the 2018 Tim Burgess album: As I Was Now.

And collaborated with the American poet Ann Waldman for the 2020 album Shiamachy, along with William Parker and Laurie Anderson.

In 2022 Brix Smith announced that Googe would be part of her new, all women, live band.

References

Living people
1962 births
People from Yeovil
Alternative rock bass guitarists
English rock bass guitarists
Lesbian musicians
English LGBT musicians
British LGBT singers
Women bass guitarists
My Bloody Valentine (band) members
Primal Scream members
Shoegaze musicians